Qhobeng is a community council located in the Mohale's Hoek District of Lesotho. Its population in 2006 was 3,083.

Villages
The community of Qhobeng includes the villages of Ha Jane, Ha Khojane, Ha Kotsoana, Ha Lekitla, Ha Letsie, Ha Matabane, Ha Mothibi, Ha Nthamaha, Ha Ntjanyana, Ha Oetsi, Ha Polile, Ha Ralekhoasa, Ha Rantoetsi, Ha Sekhoko, Ha Sepolo, Ha Serokola, Ha Sibisibi, Ha Tau, Ha Teleki, Ha Tšiame, Habasisi (Malachabela), Ketanyane, Koting-sa-Matsa, Lekhalong, Letlapeng (Ha Mpache), Likoaeng, Majapereng, Matebeleng (Ha Mphekeleli), Nompilo, Poriki and Thaba-Sekoka.

References

External links
 Google map of community villages

Populated places in Mohale's Hoek District